Ratatat Remixes Vol. 1 is a self-released remix album by the Brooklyn indie electronic rock duo Ratatat. It includes songs from hip-hop artists Missy Elliott, Kanye West, Raekwon and Ghostface Killah, among others. In an interview with Glide Magazine, Ratatat member Mike Stroud acknowledged both the marked departure from their instrumental first album Ratatat and perceived dichotomous nature of their sound by saying, "Especially with remixes, we approach it a bit differently than our other music. It's something we originally did for fun, that's now part of what we are."

Track listing
Ratatat/Brooklyn Zoo – "Intro" 
Beanie Sigel & Dirt McGirt – "When You Hear That"
Missy Elliott – "Hot" (WEA/Elektra)
Raekwon – "Smith Bros." 
Kanye West – "Get Em High" (Def Jam)
G-Unit – "Stunt 101" (Interscope)
Dizzee Rascal – "Fix Up" (XL)
Method Man & Buddha Monk of Brooklyn Zoo – "PLO Style"
Lazer Life of Brooklyn Zoo – "Freestyle" 
Raekwon & Ghostface Killah – "Cutting It Up"
L.O.X. – "Dirty Ryders" 
Jay-Z – "Sunshine" (Roc-A-Fella)
Missy Elliott – "Wake Up" (WEA/Elektra)
Ghostface Killah & Jadakiss – "Run" (Def Jam)

References

External links
Official Ratatat website
Rolling Stone "Hot Remixers" article

2004 mixtape albums
Ratatat albums
2004 remix albums
Self-released albums
Albums produced by E*vax